"Contact" is a song by French electronic music duo Daft Punk. It is the thirteenth and final track from the duo's fourth studio album Random Access Memories, released on 17 May 2013. The track was written and produced by the duo, with additional writing and co-production by DJ Falcon. Daryl Braithwaite, Tony Mitchell, and Garth Porter are also credited as writers due to the song containing a sample of "We Ride Tonight" by Australian rock band The Sherbs. The song includes audio from the Apollo 17 mission, courtesy of NASA and Captain Eugene Cernan. Due to digital downloads of Random Access Memories, the song charted at number 46 on the French Singles Chart and at number 24 on the Billboard Dance/Electronic Songs chart.

Production
"Contact" was produced with DJ Falcon, who had previously worked with Thomas Bangalter as a duo called Together. Falcon is also a Roulé labelmate with Bangalter, the founder of Roulé. "Contact" begins with a sample of "We Ride Tonight" by The Sherbs. The sample was previously used by Bangalter and Falcon as part of a DJ set by Together in 2002. The set also featured Cassius. Daryl Braithwaite of The Sherbs had been informed of the sampling in "Contact" before the Daft Punk song was released. He also specified that he, Tony Mitchell and Garth Porter of The Sherbs would be credited as co-writers of "Contact" because of the sample, and thus would receive royalties. In addition to the sampling, "Contact" is said by Q Magazine to be composed of orchestral and synthesizer riffs, progressive layers and concludes with what Louis Lepron of Konbini called a "sharp guitar chord". The modular synthesizer on the track was performed by Daft Punk and Falcon, while bass and drums were performed by James Genus and Omar Hakim, respectively.

Falcon noted that when he worked on "Contact" with Daft Punk in Paris, they felt that it needed something akin to a countdown. NASA was eventually contacted, and they gladly gave the duo access to all of their mission recordings to sample. Daft Punk and Falcon settled on an excerpt where someone was called "Bob", as that was Falcon's skating nickname when he was first introduced to Bangalter and Guy-Manuel de Homem-Christo. The NASA sample features a recording of Eugene Cernan from the Apollo 17 mission, in which he observes a flashing object from a window of his capsule. It was later surmised that the particle was a discarded rocket stage. Bangalter emphasized the choice of Cernan, the last man to leave the surface of the moon on the final Apollo mission, being used to end the album.

Falcon recalled that upon playback of the completed "Contact", the studio speakers had blown out as a result of the sounds from the end of the track. He likened the effect to the end of a rock concert where guitars are thrown to the floor. NME interpreted the sound as "not unlike a huge pyramid blasting off into space", a reference to the stage visuals of Daft Punk's Alive 2006/2007 tour.

Personnel
Personnel adapted from album's liner notes.

Daft Punk – modular synthesizer
DJ Falcon – modular synthesizer
James Genus – bass
Omar Hakim – drums

Charts

Weekly charts

Year-end charts

References

2013 songs
Daft Punk songs
Songs written by Garth Porter
Songs written by Thomas Bangalter
Songs written by Guy-Manuel de Homem-Christo
Songs written by Daryl Braithwaite
Songs written by Tony Mitchell (musician)
Songs containing the I–V-vi-IV progression
Music with NASA audio